CADAC (Commercial And Domestic Appliance Company), a South African company headquartered in Johannesburg, is a marketer of a wide range of outdoor leisure and patio products designed for durability, portability and convenience.

CADAC was acquired by the Dometic Group in September 2021.

Products
The main focus of their product range is charcoal and LPG-powered barbecues and grills. Cadac appears among the key suppliers in the global charcoal barbecues equipment market.
The company also sells a range of camping gear such as tents, cooler boxes and various outdoor clothing items.

History
CADAC, a division of MTM Trading, was founded in 1951 and started the manufacture of portable liquefied petroleum gas (LPG) cylinders, lamps, cookers, stoves, heaters and barbecue equipment in 1957.

Website
https://www.cadacinternational.com/en_us/

References

1951 establishments in South Africa
Home appliance manufacturers of South Africa
Manufacturing companies based in Johannesburg
Manufacturing companies established in 1951
Camping equipment manufacturers